Doi Lo is a tambon (subdistrict) of Doi Lo District, in Chiang Mai Province, Thailand. In 2015 it had a population of 12,261 people.

History
The subdistrict was created 1 August 1979 by splitting off eight administrative villages from Song Khwae.

Administration

Central administration
The tambon is divided into 26 administrative villages (mubans).

Local administration
The subdistrict is covered by the subdistrict administrative organization (SAO) Doi Lo (องค์การบริหารส่วนตำบลดอยหล่อ).

References

External links
Thaitambon.com on Doi Lo

Tambon of Chiang Mai province
Populated places in Chiang Mai province